Emmitt James Smith III (born May 15, 1969) is an American former professional football player who was a running back in the National Football League (NFL) for 15 seasons, primarily with the Dallas Cowboys. Among other accolades, he is the league's all-time leading rusher.

Smith grew up in Pensacola, Florida, and became the second-leading rusher in American high school football history while playing for Escambia High School. Smith played three years of college football for the Florida Gators, where he set numerous school rushing records. After being named a unanimous All-American in 1989, Smith chose to forgo his senior year of eligibility and play professionally.

The Cowboys selected Smith in the first round of the 1990 NFL draft. During his long professional career, he rushed for 18,355 yards, breaking the record formerly held by Walter Payton. He also holds the record for career rushing touchdowns with 164. Smith is the only running back to ever win a Super Bowl championship, the NFL Most Valuable Player award, the NFL rushing crown, and the Super Bowl Most Valuable Player award all in the same season (1993).  He is also one of four running backs to lead the NFL in rushing three or more consecutive seasons, joining Steve Van Buren, Jim Brown and Earl Campbell. Smith led the league in rushing and won the Super Bowl in the same year three times (1992, 1993, and 1995) when to that point it had never been done. Smith is also one of only two non-kickers in NFL history to score more than 1,000 career points (the other being Jerry Rice). Smith was inducted to the Pro Football Hall of Fame in 2010 and the College Football Hall of Fame in 2006.

Smith played thirteen seasons with the Cowboys and two with the Arizona Cardinals. While playing for Dallas, Smith plus quarterback Troy Aikman and wide receiver Michael Irvin were known as "The Triplets," and they led their team to three Super Bowl championships during the 1990s.

Early years

Smith was born in Pensacola, Florida, the son of Mary J. Smith and Emmitt James Smith, Jr.  At the age of eight, he played his first organized football game on a team that was sponsored by the Salvation Army. He attended Escambia High School in Pensacola, where he played high school football and ran track for the Escambia Gators.  During Smith's high school football career, Escambia won two state football championships, and Smith rushed for 106 touchdowns and 8,804 yards, which was the second most yardage in the history of American high school football at the time. Emmitt rushed for over 100 yards in 45 of the 49 games he started for Escambia (including the last 28 in a row) and finished with a 7.8 yards per carry average.  Twice, he broke the 2,000-yard rushing mark in a season. In track & field, Smith competed as a sprinter and was a member of the 4 × 100 m (42.16 s) relay squad.

For his efforts, Smith was named the USA Today and Parade magazine high school player of the year for 1986. In 2007, twenty years after Smith graduated from high school, the Florida High School Athletic Association (FHSAA) named Smith to its All-Century Team and recognized him as the Florida high school football "Player of the Century."

Despite his accomplishments and accolades, some college recruiting analysts opined that he was too small and too slow to succeed in major college football when he signed to play for the University of Florida.  Recruiting expert Max Emfinger didn't list Smith among the top 50 high school running backs in his high school class and opined that, "Emmitt Smith is a lugger, not a runner.  He's not fast.  He can't get around the corner.  When he falls flat on his face, remember where you heard it first."

College career

1987 season 
Smith accepted an athletic scholarship to attend the University of Florida in Gainesville, where he played for coach Galen Hall's Gators for three seasons   He did not start the first two games of his college career in the fall of 1987, but made the most of his opportunities in a second-week rout of Tulsa in which he gained 109 yards on just ten carries, including a 66-yard touchdown run.  That performance earned him a spot in the starting lineup the following week in the Gators' SEC opener against Alabama at Legion Field.

In his first collegiate start, Smith promptly broke Florida's 57-year-old all-time single game rushing record held by Red Bethea, carrying 39 times for 224 yards and two touchdowns as the Gators upset the Crimson Tide.  Smith went on to break the 1,000-yard barrier in the seventh game of his freshman season, the fastest any running back had ever broken that barrier to begin his college career.  He finished the season with 1,341 yards, was named SEC and National Freshman of the Year, and was ninth in the balloting for the Heisman Trophy.

1988 season 
The Gators got off to a 5-0 start in 1988 with Smith averaging over 120 rushing yards per game. However, during the sixth contest against Memphis State in mid-October, he was sidelined with a sprained knee and starting quarterback Kyle Morris broke his finger, leading to an upset loss. Smith was unable to return to action for a month, during which Florida lost four games in a row and did not score a touchdown in 14 consecutive quarters of play, including a 16-0 loss to Auburn that is their most recent shutout to date.

Smith returned to the lineup in mid-November and Florida won two of its final three games, highlighted by a victory in the 1988 All-American Bowl in which he ran 55-yards for a  touchdown on the first play from scrimmage and was named the game's MVP. Smith rushed for 988 yards on the year (not including the bowl game) at 110 yards per game, the lowest totals of his college career.

1989 season 
Smith stayed healthy throughout his junior season in 1989 and found success again.  He finished the campaign with Florida records for rushing yards in a season (1,599), rushing yards in a single game (316 versus New Mexico in October 1989), longest rushing play (96 yards against Mississippi State in 1988), career rushing yards (3,928), career rushing yards per game (126.7) and career rushing touchdowns (36), among many others. In all, Smith owned 58 school records at the conclusion of his Florida career despite playing on Florida teams with virtually no passing game, which made him the focal point of opposing defenses.

At the conclusion of his junior season in 1989, Smith was named a first-team SEC selection for the third year and SEC Player of the Year, was a unanimous first-team All-American, and finished seventh in the Heisman Trophy balloting. In his final game in the Freedom Bowl, he had few rushing attempts after Florida fell behind Washington early and were forced 

Days later on January 1, 1990, Steve Spurrier was introduced as the Gators' new  Smith, concerned about his potential role in Spurrier's reportedly pass-first offense, decided to forgo his senior year at Florida and enter the NFL draft, which for the first time in history allowed juniors to be eligible. Smith returned to the university during the NFL off-season and completed his bachelor's degree in 1996.

Smith was subsequently inducted into the University of Florida Athletic Hall of Fame as a "Gator Great" in 1999, the Gator Football Ring of Honor and the College Football Hall of Fame   As part of a series of articles written for The Gainesville Sun in 2006, he was recognized as the No. 3 all-time player among the top 100 from the first 100 years of the Gators football program.

Professional career

Dallas Cowboys (1990–2002)

In the 1990 NFL Draft the Dallas Cowboys considered drafting linebacker James Francis with their first round selection, but after he was taken by the Cincinnati Bengals, the Cowboys focused on improving their running game when Smith started dropping, because despite his collegiate success, some NFL teams still felt that Smith was too small and slow for the pro game. The Cowboys traded up with the Pittsburgh Steelers moving from the 21st to the 17th position, in exchange for a third round draft choice (#81-Craig Veasey), to select Smith in the first round. Even though he missed all of the preseason after having the longest holdout by a rookie in franchise history, he was able to start 15 games, rush for 937 yards and 11 touchdowns, while being named NFL Offensive Rookie of the Year and receiving Pro Bowl honors.

In 1991, he registered 1,563 rushing yards and 12 touchdowns. He also clinched the first of four rushing titles, after tallying 160 yards against the Atlanta Falcons in the season finale.

In 1992, he set the Cowboys' single-season franchise record and won the rushing title with 1,713 yards. He also became the first player to win the league's rushing title and the Super Bowl in the same season.

In 1993, he missed all of training camp and the first 2 regular season games. The Cowboys lost both contests with rookie Derrick Lassic running in his place. With the season in jeopardy the Cowboys relented and reached an agreement, making Smith the highest paid running back in the league. Smith posted 1,486 rushing yards, 9 touchdowns and helped the Cowboys become the first team to win a Super Bowl after starting the season 0-2. He also received the league MVP and the Super Bowl XXVIII MVP award. On October 31, his 237 rushing yards against the Philadelphia Eagles set the single-season franchise record. His career signature game came in the season finale against the New York Giants, with the Cowboys desperately trying to clinch the NFC East title and a first-round bye in the playoffs, Smith suffered a first-degree separation in his right shoulder during the first half, but still finished with 229 total yards and played a key role in a 16-13 overtime win.

The next season saw Smith led the league with 21 rushing touchdowns, a new career-high despite battling a hamstring pull late in the season. However, the Cowboys lost the NFC Championship Game to the 49ers.

In 1995, Smith became the first player in league history to rush for 1,400 rushing yards or more in five consecutive seasons and set the NFL record with 25 rushing touchdowns. Smith, Jim Brown, Adrian Peterson and LaDainian Tomlinson are the only players with seven straight ten-touchdown seasons to start their careers. He also broke two of Tony Dorsett's Dallas franchise rushing records, the first for most consecutive initial games of a season with 100+ rushing yards (Smith's four to Dorsett's three) and the second for single-season rushing yards (1,773 to Dorsett's 1,646). Both records would hold for 19 years until 2014, when DeMarco Murray rushed for 100+ yards in each of his first eight games and accumulated 1,845 rushing yards over the course of the season.

In 1996, he scored his 100th career rushing touchdown and surpassed 10,000 career rushing yards, becoming just the twelfth player in league history and the youngest one to reach this milestone.

In 1998, he became the Cowboys' all-time leading rusher (passing Dorsett) and the NFL's all-time rushing touchdown leader (surpassing Marcus Allen). The next year, he became the NFL's all-time leader in career postseason rushing yards (1,586) and postseason rushing touchdowns (19).

With 1,021 rushing yards in 2001, Smith became the first player in NFL history with 11 consecutive 1,000 yard seasons and the first to post eleven 1,000-yard rushing seasons in a career.

In 2002, he reached the goal he set as a rookie, finishing the season with 17,162 career yards and breaking the NFL rushing record previously held by Walter Payton against the Seattle Seahawks. In the same game against the Seahawks, Smith ran for a touchdown that gave him 150 career rushing touchdowns. After the season, the Cowboys hired head coach Bill Parcells who wanted to go with younger running backs and released Smith on February 26, 2003.

Arizona Cardinals (2003–2004)

On March 26, 2003, Smith signed a two-year contract as a free agent with the Arizona Cardinals, who were not only looking for Smith to improve their team, but also helped them promote it with their local fan base. Responding to questions about what he could do as a 34-year old running back, he said "I think I'm a 1,300-yard back, and I will be out to prove that." Head Coach Dave McGinnis announced that Smith would start for the Cardinals. On October 5, in a highly anticipated game, he returned to Texas Stadium to play against the Cowboys, but suffered a broken left shoulder blade after safety Roy Williams hit him in the second quarter. The Cardinals lost 7-24, and Smith's 6 carries for minus-1 yards marked the first time in his career he rushed for negative yardage. The injury forced him to miss 6 games, and he eventually finished the season with 256 rushing yards and averaged just 2.8 yards per carry.

In 2004, new head coach Dennis Green was hired and named Smith as the team's starter at running back. He posted 937 rushing yards and 9 touchdowns. He also became the oldest player in NFL history ever to throw his first touchdown pass, throwing a 21-yard touchdown strike on a halfback option play, the only passing attempt of his career. (Video of pass.)

Smith had 1,193 rushing yards, 11 rushing touchdowns and averaged 3.2 yards per carry in his 2-year time in Arizona. He also had 212 receiving yards, no receiving touchdowns and averaged 7.3 yards per reception in his 2-year time with the Arizona Cardinals.

Three days before Super Bowl XXXIX on February 3, 2005, Smith announced his retirement from the NFL. He was not re-signed by the Cardinals and signed a one-day contract for one dollar with the Dallas Cowboys, after which he immediately retired with the team he had played with for most of his career.

NFL records
Smith currently holds the NFL record in career rushing yards with 18,355, breaking the previous record held by Walter Payton, on October 27, 2002. He leads all running backs with 164 career rushing touchdowns, and his 175 total touchdowns ranks him second only to Jerry Rice's 208. The total of his rushing yards, receiving yards (3,224) and fumble return yards (-15) gives him a total of 21,564 yards from the line of scrimmage, making him one of only four players in NFL history to eclipse the 21,000 combined-yards mark. (The others are Jerry Rice, Brian Mitchell and Walter Payton)

He is the NFL's all-time leader in rushing attempts with 4,409, the only player to post three seasons with 19 or more touchdowns, and the record-holder for most games in a season with a touchdown and most games in a season with a rushing touchdown (15), set in 1995.

Smith also accumulated several NFL postseason records, including rushing touchdowns (19), consecutive games with a rushing touchdown (9), and 100-yard rushing games (7). His 1,586 yards rushing is also top on the NFL postseason chart, and he shares the total playoff touchdown mark of 21 with Thurman Thomas. With the Cowboys, Smith won three Super Bowl rings and rushed for over 100 yards in two of those games, Super Bowl XXVII (108 yards and a touchdown, and six receptions for 27 yards), and Super Bowl XXVIII (132 yards and two touchdowns, and four receptions for 26 yards). Smith received the Super Bowl MVP award for Super Bowl XXVIII, becoming the only Cowboys running back ever to win the award. He also scored two touchdowns in Super Bowl XXX.

Smith is one of only five NFL players who have amassed over 10,000 career-rushing yards and 400 career receptions. Smith and Jerry Rice are the only two non-kickers in NFL history to score 1,000 points in a career.

Playing style

As a runner, Smith was consistently effective, though not dazzling in style. "(Smith) darted, slithered and followed his blockers, and squeezed yard after yard out of plays that didn't have any yards in them. He didn't look especially fast or powerful or blindingly deceptive, yet he couldn't be stopped."  Smith was noted for being a very durable back with excellent vision, tremendous leg strength, and great balance, and was known as one of the best second-effort runners ever. Smith was also a reliable receiver and an excellent blocker in pass protection.

During his career, he was often compared to Detroit Lions Hall of Fame running back Barry Sanders, as both men were extremely successful for their respective teams and combined for 8 rushing titles during the 1990s. Some give Smith the edge for his consistent "north-south" style that took full advantage of Dallas' talented offensive line, while some think Sanders' spectacular running style with sudden changes of direction made him a better back.  Observers agree, though, that both Smith and Sanders were among the best running backs in league history.

Although Smith is the only player to tell John Madden that Madden NFL rated his skills too high, he was ranked No. 68 on The Sporting News''' list of the 100 Greatest Football Players in 1999, three years before becoming the game's all-time rushing yardage leader.

NFL career statistics

Regular season

Life after football

In 2002, Smith and his wife founded the Pat & Emmitt Smith Charities as a 501(c)(3) nonprofit with the mission to "seek a reality where children have the resources necessary to realize their full potential."

In September 2005, Smith signed on to serve as a studio analyst on the NFL Network show, NFL Total Access.

On September 19, 2005, at halftime of the Cowboys-Redskins game (broadcast on Monday Night Football), Smith was inducted into the Dallas Cowboys Ring of Honor with his long-time teammates Troy Aikman and Michael Irvin.

On July 23, 2006, Smith was a judge at the Miss Universe 2006 pageant.

In the fall of 2006, Smith won the third season of Dancing with the Stars with professional dancer Cheryl Burke. Smith was praised for "making dancing look manly" and for his "natural charm," and Burke was given credit for coaching Smith while still allowing him to improvise some moves.

On March 12, 2007, Smith joined ESPN as a studio analyst for their NFL pre-game coverage alongside Chris Berman, Mike Ditka, Tom Jackson, and Chris Mortensen. However, he was removed from this coverage for the 2008 season. Instead, he appeared Sunday mornings during the NFL season on SportsCenter. He performs with Steve Young and Stuart Scott at the Monday Night Football site each week on Monday Night Countdown. His contract was not renewed for the 2009 season.

Smith was criticized by some in the media and sports blogs as being inarticulate.  Jimmy Kimmel Live! created a video called "Emmitt Smith: Wordsmith" mocking his numerous malapropisms. Sports Illustrated's Peter King called Smith's comments regarding Michael Vick's involvement in the Bad Newz Kennels "idiotic and inappropriate."

Smith was elected to the Pro Football Hall of Fame in 2010, in his first year of eligibility.

On February 7, 2010, Smith flipped the coin at the start of Super Bowl XLIV between the Indianapolis Colts and the New Orleans Saints.

In June 2010, Smith returned to his high school alma mater, Escambia High School in Pensacola, Florida, for a taping of ESPN's show Homecoming with Rick Reilly. In October 2010, he was inducted into the Escambia High School Sports Hall of Fame during halftime of an EHS football game, along with former Seattle Mariners third baseman Jim Presley and several other EHS alumni.

In 2005, Smith made his first move toward becoming a real estate developer: He teamed with another Cowboy legend, Roger Staubach, the founder and CEO of Staubach Co., to form Smith/Cypress Partners LP, a real estate development enterprise specializing in transforming underutilized parcels in densely populated areas into commercially viable properties anchored by national retail giants.

In his first deal, Smith helped the firm sign Mervyn's, a California-based department store chain, to anchor a $45 million,  project in Phoenix.

With access to $50 million in capital, Smith has several other projects in the works. He has a letter of intent to develop a  site in a densely populated yet underserved area near northwest Fort Worth (it was formerly a college operated by a Masonic lodge), and he is currently negotiating for rights to another potential project in southeastern Fort Worth.

"There's a huge need for top-quality retail in these areas, and I understand how the deals are cut," Smith said before lunch. "I'm not an engineer. I'm not a contractor. And I'm still learning the jargon. But I understand deals, and the only way to grow is to be in the middle of the deals."

Smith/Cypress is a joint venture (Smith owns 51 percent) with Cypress Equities, the retail development arm of Roger Staubach's real estate services company. Early in his own playing career, Smith approached the former Cowboy quarterback with an interest in learning more about real estate. Skeptical at first, Staubach told Smith to spend some time at his company's offices during the spring and summer if he was sincere. Smith did just that, spending the off-season at Staubach Co.'s headquarters in Dallas. Staubach founded the company in the late 1970s to locate and negotiate office and retail space for clients.

In 2014, Smith's company began a nationwide expansion, including into New York City.

Smith also co-founded ESmith Legacy, a Baltimore-based company that specializes in commercial real estate development and investment management. He serves as its Chairman of the Board and Chief Executive Officer.

In 2007, he was a guest on How I Met Your Mother, where he joked about Super Bowl on this question asked by Barney Stinson "What is more important than the Super Bowl? - Dance, my friend, dance".

Smith participated in the 2011 National Heads-Up Poker Championship, defeating David Williams in the first round and losing in the second round to Andrew Robl.

He returned to Dancing with the Stars in its fifteenth season as one of the "All-Stars" contestants. Smith once again had Cheryl Burke as his professional dance partner. They were voted off during the ninth week of the competition.

In 2016, Smith took the position of co-owner alongside founder and president Ben Davis of The Gents Place, an ultra-premium men's grooming and lifestyle club founded in Frisco, Texas. The company has grown to include lifestyle clubs in Dallas and Southlake, as well as Leawood, Kansas.

In 2019, Smith appeared on an episode of Deal or No Deal to support a contestant who idolizes him.

In 2021, Smith would team up with NASCAR driver, Jesse Iwuji, to form a NASCAR Xfinity Series team called Jesse Iwuji Motorsports, that will compete full-time in 2022.

Personal life

Smith was initiated as a member of the Phi Beta Sigma Fraternity at the University of Florida. He returned to the university during the NFL offseason to complete his coursework, and graduated with his bachelor's degree in public recreation in May 1996.

Smith is a devout Christian. He has a daughter, Rheagen Smith (born November 2, 1998), with ex-girlfriend Hope Wilson.  He married former Miss Virginia USA Patricia Southall on April 22, 2000. They have three children together: Emmitt James Smith IV (born May 15, 2002), Skylar Smith (born October 15, 2003), and Elijah Alexander James Smith (born September 22, 2010). Smith is also the stepfather to Jasmine Page Lawrence (born January 15, 1996), who is Southall's daughter with ex-husband, actor-comedian Martin Lawrence.

His brother, Emory, played on the practice squads of the Cowboys and the Green Bay Packers. Smith's eldest son, E. J., committed to play college football at Stanford in 2020.

See also

 1989 College Football All-America Team
 Florida Gators football, 1980–89
 List of College Football Hall of Fame inductees (players, A–K)
 List of College Football Hall of Fame inductees (players, L–Z)
 List of Dallas Cowboys first-round draft picks
 List of Dallas Cowboys players
 List of Florida Gators football All-Americans
 List of Florida Gators in the NFL Draft
 List of Pro Football Hall of Fame inductees
 List of National Football League rushing yards leaders
 List of National Football League rushing champions
 List of SEC Most Valuable Players
 List of University of Florida alumni
 List of University of Florida Athletic Hall of Fame members

References

Bibliography

 Carlson, Norm, University of Florida Football Vault: The History of the Florida Gators, Whitman Publishing, LLC, Atlanta, Georgia (2007). .
 Golenbock, Peter, Go Gators!  An Oral History of Florida's Pursuit of Gridiron Glory, Legends Publishing, LLC, St. Petersburg, Florida (2002). .
 Hairston, Jack, Tales from the Gator Swamp: A Collection of the Greatest Gator Stories Ever Told, Sports Publishing, LLC, Champaign, Illinois (2002). .
 McCarthy, Kevin M.,  Fightin' Gators: A History of University of Florida Football, Arcadia Publishing, Mount Pleasant, South Carolina (2000). .
 Nash, Noel, ed., The Gainesville Sun Presents The Greatest Moments in Florida Gators Football'', Sports Publishing, Inc., Champaign, Illinois (1998). .

External links

 Official website
 ESmith Legacy, Inc. – Official Website
 Emmitt Smith Cowboys Ring of Honor
 Dallas Cowboys Top 50 players
 
 

1969 births
Living people
African-American Christians
African-American players of American football
All-American college football players
American football running backs
Arizona Cardinals players
College football announcers
College Football Hall of Fame inductees
Dallas Cowboys players
Dancing with the Stars (American TV series) winners
Florida Gators football players
National Conference Pro Bowl players
National Football League announcers
National Football League Offensive Rookie of the Year Award winners
Participants in American reality television series
Players of American football from Pensacola, Florida
Pro Football Hall of Fame inductees
Super Bowl MVPs
21st-century African-American people
20th-century African-American sportspeople
National Football League Most Valuable Player Award winners